Zauber is a surname, and a German language word for magic. It is the surname of:
Angelika Zauber (born 1958), German runner
Ann Zauber, American biostatistician
Samuel Zauber (1901–1986), Romanian association football player

See also
Leni Zauber, alias of fictional comic character Mystique
Zauber, final boss in 1998 video game Destrega
Die Zauberflote (The Magic Flute), opera by Mozart